Hans Wassmann (1 January 1873 – 5 April 1932) was a German film actor.

Selected filmography
 Laugh Bajazzo (1915)
 Miss Venus (1921)
 Louise de Lavallière (1922)
 A Glass of Water (1923)
 Nanon (1924)
 Garragan (1924)
 The Great Unknown (1924)
 The Love Trap (1925)
 Hussar Fever (1925)
 Chaste Susanne (1926)
 Queen Louise (1927)
 Dancing Vienna (1927)
 Light-Hearted Isabel (1927)
 A Modern Dubarry (1927)
 The Master of Nuremberg (1927)
 Luther (1928)
 My Wife, the Impostor (1931)
 Ronny (1931)
 The Captain from Köpenick (1931)
 The Battle of Bademunde (1931)
 Shooting Festival in Schilda (1931)
 Queen of the Night (1931)
 The Mad Bomberg (1932)
 The Office Manager (1932)
 Scandal on Park Street (1932)
 Things Are Getting Better Already (1932)

References

Bibliography
 Chandler, Charlotte. Marlene: Marlene Dietrich, A Personal Biography. Simon and Schuster, 2011.

External links

1873 births
1932 deaths
German male film actors
German male silent film actors
20th-century German male actors
Male actors from Berlin